Nancy Pickard (born September 19, 1945 in Kansas City, Missouri) is an American crime novelist. She has won five Macavity Awards, four Agatha Awards, an Anthony Award, and a Shamus Award. She is the only author to win all four awards. She also served on the board of directors of the Mystery Writers of America. She received a degree in journalism from the University of Missouri in Columbia, Missouri and began writing when she was 35 years old.

She is frequently a panelist at the Great Manhattan Mystery Conclave, a convention for mystery writers and mystery fans in Manhattan, Kansas.

Bibliography

Jenny Cain series 

 1984 Generous Death 
 1985 Say No to Murder 
 1986 No Body 
 1987 Marriage is Murder 
 1988 Dead Crazy 
 1990 Bum Steer 
 1991 I.O.U. 
 1993 But I Wouldn't Want to Die There 
 1994 Confession 
 1995 Twilight

Eugenia Potter Series 

 1992 The 27-Ingredient Chili Con Carne Murders (w/Virginia Rich) 
 1998 The Blue Corn Murders 
 2001 The Secret Ingredient Murders

Marie Lightfoot series 
 2000 The Whole Truth 
 2001 Ring of Truth 
 2002 The Truth Hurts

Non-series novels 

 2001 Naked Came the Phoenix (serial novel) Marcia Talley, ed. (with Nevada Barr, Mary Jane Clark, Diana Gabaldon, J. A. Jance, Faye Kellerman, Laurie R. King, Val McDermid, Perri O'Shaughnessy, Anne Perry, J. D. Robb and Lisa Scottoline)
 2006 The Virgin of Small Plains 
 2010 The Scent of Rain and Lightning

Short stories 

 1981 "A Man Around the House"
 1987 "I, Witness"
 1989 "Afraid All the Time"
 1989 "The Dead Past"
 1990 "Storm Warnings"
 1991 "Dust Devil"
 1991 "Lazy Susan"
 1991 "The Scar"
 1992 "Every Wednesday"
 1992 "Fat Cat"
 1992 "Sex and Violence"
 1994 "Sign of the Times"
 1995 "Speak No Evil"
 1995 "Valentine's Night"
 1996 "A Rock and a Hard Place"
 1997 "Dr. Couch Saves a Cat"
 1997 "It Had to Be You"
 1997 "Lady Finch-Waller Regrets"
 1997 "Love's Cottage"
 1997 "The Potluck Supper Murders"
 1998 "Dr. Couch Saves a Bird"
 1998 "The Private Life of a Private Eye"
 1999 "The First Ladies' Secret"
 1999 "Nine Points for Murder"
 1999 "Out of Africa"
 1999 "Verdict"
 2000 "Afraid of the Dark"
 2001 "Lucky Devil"
 2001 "Tea for Two"
 2002 "Dr. Couch Saves a President"
 2002 "Old Eyes"
 2005 "There is No Crime on Easter Island"

Short story anthologies 

 1994 Nancy Pickard presents Malice Domestic 3 
 1999 Storm Warnings 
 1999 The First Lady Murders 
 1999 Mom, Apple Pie, and Murder

Non-fiction 

 2003 Seven Steps on the Writer's Path (with Lynn Lott)

Awards and recognition 

 1986 Anthony award winner, best paperback original, Say No to Murder
 1987 Anthony award nominee, best novel, No Body
 1988 Agatha award nominee, best novel, Dead Crazy
 1988 Anthony award nominee, best novel, Marriage is Murder
 1988 Macavity award winner, best novel, Marriage is Murder
 1989 Agatha award nominee, best short story, "Afraid All The Time"
 1990 Edgar award nominee, best short story, "Afraid All the Time"
 1990 Agatha award winner, best novel, Bum Steer
 1990 Anthony award winner, best short story, "Afraid All the Time"
 1990 Macavity award winner, best short story, "Afraid All the Time"
 1991 Agatha award winner,  best novel, I.O.U.
 1991 Shamus award winner, best short story, "Dust Devil"
 1992 Anthony award nominee, best novel, I.O.U.
 1992 Edgar award nominee, best mystery novel, I.O.U.
 1992 Macavity award winner, best novel, I.O.U.
 1995 Agatha award nominee, best novel, Twilight
 1999 Agatha award winner, best short story, "Out of Africa"
 2000 Edgar award nominee, best novel, The Whole Truth
 2001 Macavity award nominee, best mystery novel, The Whole Truth
 2006 Agatha award winner, best novel, The Virgin of Small Plains
 2006 Anthony award nominee, best novel, The Virgin of Small Plains
 2006 Edgar award nominee, best novel, The Virgin of Small Plains
 2006 Macavity award winner, best short story, "There Is No Crime on Easter Island"
 2007 Macavity award winner, best mystery novel, The Virgin of Small Plains
 2008 Agatha award nominee, best short story, "A Nice Old Guy"
 2011 Macavity award nominee, best mystery novel, The Scent of Rain and Lightning

See also 
 The Scent of Rain and Lightning

References

External links 
• Interview with Nancy Pickard, A DISCUSSION WITH National Authors on Tour TV Series, Episode #56 (1993)

University of Missouri alumni
Agatha Award winners
1945 births
Living people
Anthony Award winners
Macavity Award winners
Barry Award winners
Writers from Kansas City, Missouri
Women mystery writers